Ulugh Beg II also known as Ulugh Beg Kabuli (d.1502) was the Timurid ruler of Kabul and Ghazni from 1461 to 1502.

Reign
Born the fourth son of the Timurid Sultan Abu Sa'id Mirza, Ulugh Beg was given the cities of Kabul and Ghazni by his father, governing first as a prince and then, after Abu Sa'id's death, as an independent monarch. His elder brothers, Ahmad Mirza and Mahmud Mirza, were given the rule of Samarqand and Badakhshan respectively, while another brother, Umar Shaikh Mirza, received Farghana. The latter became the father of Babur, who later founded the Mughal Empire.

Ulugh Beg had a long and stable reign, during which Kabul became a cultural centre. The discovery of a number of books from his library, including a copy of the Shahnameh, confirms the activity of a royal scriptorium during his reign. The elaborate frontispiece of one manuscript suggests that illuminators, calligraphers, and possibly painters were attached to Ulugh Beg's court. He also had a love of gardens, which was noted by his nephew Babur who had inherited this trait. The names of some of those he had commissioned have been recorded, such as the Bagh-e Behesht (Garden of Paradise) and the Bostan-Sara (Home of Orchards).

During his reign, the Pashtun Yusufzai tribe first arrived in Kabul. Some traditions state that the group had lent their support to Ulugh Beg, who in turn highly favoured them. However, during the last quarter of the 15th century, relations between the tribe and the ruler became strained. Eventually, with the assistance of the Gugyani tribe, Ulugh Beg allegedly had many of the tribal leaders assassinated. Orientalist Annette Beveridge records the following story regarding Ulugh Beg and the head of the Yusufzai, Malik Sulaiman:

Alternatively, another account states that after the Yusufzais migrated to Kabul, they resorted to banditry alongside a number of other tribes. This reached such an extent that Ulugh Beg subsequently had the group expelled from the region.

Death and succession

Ulugh Beg died in 1502 and was likely buried in the Abdur Razaq Mausoleum in Ghazni. Though the tomb is named for his son, Abdur Razaq's short reign of only a year makes it unlikely that he had the opportunity to order its construction. It is instead more probable that the tomb was originally built by Ulugh Beg for his own use, with Abdur Razaq being interred in it later.

Abdur Razaq, who was still in his minority at the time of his father's death, was quickly usurped by one of his ministers. A tumultuous period followed, which only ended with Muhammad Mukim Arghun, Ulugh Beg's son-in-law, taking control of Kabul. Finally, Ulugh Beg's nephew Babur, seeing Muqim as a usurper, drove out the latter and captured the city for himself in 1504, pensioning off his cousin Abdur Razaq with an estate. It was from here that Babur later launched his invasion of the Indian subcontinent.

Issue
Abdur Razaq Mirza (d.1509) – briefly ruler of Kabul
Miran Shah Mirza
Biki Begum – married Muhammad Ma'asum Mirza, son of Sultan Husayn Bayqara of Herat
Kabuli Begum - married first Badi' al-Zaman Mirza, married second Qambar Mirza Kukaltash
Bibi Zarif – married Muhammad Mukim Arghun

References

1502 deaths
Timurid monarchs
Timurid dynasty
15th-century monarchs in Asia
People from Kabul